Haddrick is a surname. Notable people with the surname include:

Alfred Haddrick (1868–1939), Australian cricketer
Greg Haddrick (born 1960), Australian screenwriter and film and television producer
Ron Haddrick (1929–2020), Australian actor, cricketer, narrator, and presenter

See also
Handrick